Cheap Hill is an unincorporated community in Cheatham County, in the U.S. state of Tennessee.

History
A post office called Cheap Hill was established in 1877, and remained in operation until 1921. According to tradition, Cheap Hill was so named on account of a store once located there which was known for its low prices.

References

Unincorporated communities in Cheatham County, Tennessee
Unincorporated communities in Tennessee